Wayne Larry Niederhauser (born October 1, 1959) is an American politician and certified public accountant from Utah. A Republican, he served as a member of the Utah State Senate from 2006 to 2018, representing the state's 9th senate district in Salt Lake County including the cities of Sandy and Draper. From 2013 to 2019, he served as President of the Utah State Senate.

Early life, education, and career
Niederhauser has bachelor's and master's degrees in accounting from the Jon M. Huntsman School of Business at Utah State University. Niederhauser and his wife Melissa met at Utah State University. They have five children, Christian (Lisa), Sarah, Molly, Ethan, and Emma. Niederhauser is a certified public accountant, small business owner, real estate developer, and has worked as an adjunct professor at Westminster College. Niederhauser is also an owner of CW Management Corporation, a real estate development company located in West Jordan.

Niederhauser is a member of the American Legislative Exchange Council (ALEC), serving as Utah state leader. He is also affiliated with the Home Builders Association and Organized Fundraising Events for Boys and Girls Club, Primary Children's Hospital, and Make-A-Wish Foundation. He is a member of the Church of Jesus Christ of Latter-day Saints.

Accomplishments and associations
 2009 ALEC Legislator of the Year
 2008 CSG Toll Fellow
 Envision Utah Board Member
 Salt Lake Convention and Visitors Bureau board member
 2004 Governor's Quality Growth Award of Merit for Planning and Design
 Shakespeare Festival Board

Political career
In addition to his service in the Utah Senate, Niederhauser is a board member for Envision Utah, the Sports Commission, the Visit Salt Lake Board (local CVB), and the Shakespearean Festival Board. In November 2012 he was elected Senate President. In 2016 Niederhauser served on the following committees:
 Executive Appropriations Committee
 Executive Offices and Criminal Justice Appropriations Subcommittee
 Public Education Appropriations Subcommittee
 Senate Education Committee
 Senate Revenue and Taxation Committee
 Legislative Management Committee

Election

2014

Legislation

References

External links
 Wayne Niederhauser website
 

1959 births
21st-century American politicians
Latter Day Saints from Utah
Living people
Republican Party Utah state senators
Utah State University alumni